Williwaw is the debut novel of Gore Vidal, written when he was 19 and first mate of a U.S. Army supply ship stationed in the Aleutian Islands. The story combines war drama, maritime adventure and a murder plot. The book was first published in 1946 in the United States by E.P. Dutton. Williwaw is the term, widely thought to be Native American in origin, for a sudden, violent Katabatic wind common to the Aleutian Islands.

Plot summary 

The story is set on a U.S. ship in the Arctic waters around the Aleutians in the Pacific Ocean in the middle of the local storm season during World War II. The nervousness and tension of the crew and a handful of passengers at the approach of the williwaw is stretched to breaking point when the Chief Engineer, Duval, falls overboard in suspicious circumstances.

See also
Typhoon (novel)

References

http://www.goodreads.com/book/show/10790039-williwaw
http://www.thereadingroom.com/books/details/williwaw-gore-vidal/771670
http://www.weatheronline.co.uk/reports/wind/The-Williwaw.htm

External links

1946 American novels
Novels by Gore Vidal
American war novels
E. P. Dutton books
Novels set in the Pacific Ocean
Novels set during World War II
1946 debut novels